Scelimeninae is a subfamily of ground hoppers belonging to the Tetrigidae family of Orthopterans.

Tribes and genera 
The Orthoptera Species File lists:

Scelimenini

Auth. Hancock, 1907
 Amphibotettix Hancock, 1906
 Bidentatettix Zheng, 1992
 Discotettix Costa, 1864
 Eufalconius Günther, 1938
 Euscelimena Günther, 1938
 Falconius Bolívar, 1898
 Gavialidium Saussure, 1862
 Hexocera Hancock, 1915
 Indoscelimena Günther, 1938
 Paragavialidium Zheng, 1994
 Paramphibotettix Günther, 1938
 Platygavialidium Günther, 1938
 Scelimena Serville, 1838
 Tagaloscelimena Günther, 1938
 Tefrinda Bolívar, 1906
 Tegotettix Hancock, 1913

tribe unassigned
 Arulenus Stål, 1877
 Dengonius Adžić, Deranja, Franjević & Skejo, 2020
 Hebarditettix Günther, 1938
 Hirrius Bolívar, 1887
 Kraengia - monotypic Kraengia apicalis Bolívar, 1909
 Zhengitettix Liang, 1994

References

Tetrigidae
Orthoptera subfamilies